Jamie O'Hara may refer to:
Jamie O'Hara (footballer) (born 1986), English footballer
Jamie O'Hara (singer) (1950–2021), American country singer
Jamie O'Hara (actress), American actress

See also
James O'Hara (disambiguation)